is a subway station on the Tokyo Metro Chiyoda Line in the Akasaka district of Minato, Tokyo, Japan, operated by Tokyo Metro.

Lines
Akasaka Station is served by the Tokyo Metro Chiyoda Line, and is numbered C-06.

Station layout

The station consists of a single island platform serving two tracks.

Platforms

History
The station opened on 20 October 1972.

The station facilities were inherited by Tokyo Metro after the privatization of the Teito Rapid Transit Authority (TRTA) in 2004.

Surrounding area
The station is located adjacent to the headquarters of Tokyo Broadcasting System Holdings, Inc. Automated platform and on-board announcements identify the station as Akasaka, Akasaka, TBS-mae.

Akasaka Sacas
TBS Broadcasting Center (the headquarters of Tokyo Broadcasting System Holdings, Inc., Tokyo Broadcasting System Television, Inc., TBS Radio & Communications, Inc., etc.)
Akasaka Biz Tower
Akasaka Blitz
Akasaka Act Theatre

References

External links

 Akasaka Station information (Tokyo Metro) 

Railway stations in Japan opened in 1972
Tokyo Metro Chiyoda Line